The Harry Sunderland Trophy is awarded annually to the man of the match in the Super League Grand Final. Named after Harry Sunderland, who was an Australian rugby league football administrator in both Australia and the United Kingdom, the Trophy was first awarded in the Rugby Football League Championship Final of the 1964–65 season following Sunderland's death.
After the 1972–73 season the play-off system was dropped as the League went to two divisions. The Trophy's use was continued in the Rugby League Premiership and Super League Premiership finals until Super League III, when a play-off system was re-introduced to determine the Champions through the Grand Final.

The trophy's winner is determined by the Rugby League Writers' Association and presented on the field immediately following the conclusion of the match. In 2011, Rob Burrow of Leeds Rhinos became the first player to achieve the unanimous votes of all 37 judges when winning the award.

Recipients

† = denotes a player who won the trophy but played on the losing team in the final.

Winners by club

Seven players have been awarded trophy twice.

See also
Clive Churchill Medal – corresponding award for the NRL Grand Final
Karyn Murphy Medal – corresponding award for the NRLW Grand Final
Norm Smith Medal – corresponding award for the AFL Grand Final
Lance Todd Trophy - similar award for Rugby Football League Challenge Cup final

References

Super League Grand Finals
Rugby league trophies and awards